The Saphir-class submarines were a class of six submarines built in France between 1926 and 1935 for the French Navy. Most saw action during World War II for the Vichy French Navy or the Free French Naval Forces. Three were captured by Italian forces but not used.

Design

They carried a complement of 42 men.

The Saphir-class submarines were constructed to be able to launch torpedoes and lay mines without surfacing. The moored contact mines they used contained 220 kg of TNT and operated at up to 200 meters of depth. They were attached to the submarine's exterior under a hydrodynamic protection and were jettisoned with compressed air.

Ships

Service 
During the war, five Saphir-class ships operated in the Mediterranean Sea and only Rubis operated with the Home Fleet. Later, she joined the ranks of the Free French Naval Forces. During its service on the side of the Allies, Rubis was a very effective ship. From April 1940 to the end of 1944, it carried out 22 mine laying operations in the waters off Norway. 15 ships sank on its mines, including minesweepers, 4 small warships, and submarines. In addition, it sank one ship with torpedoes. Only one ship in the Mediterranean Sea changed sides to join the Allies, Perle, which on July 8, 1944, was mistakenly sunk in the Atlantic by an Allied plane.

Of the remaining submarines, Diamant was scuttled at Toulon on 27 November 1942; Nautilus, Saphir and Turquoise were demobilized in Bizerte between 1941 and 1942. After the occupation of Tunis by Axis troops, they were taken over by Italians in December 1942. Saphir was renamed "FR 112", and Turquoise, "FR 116". These ships were unusable and disarmed remained in Bizerte until the end of activities in Africa. Shortly before surrendering, the Italians sank them. Only Rubis survived the war and was withdrawn from service on October 4, 1949.

See also 

List of submarines of France

References

Submarine classes
 
 
 
Ship classes of the French Navy